Otaki or Ōtaki may refer to:

Places
Ōtaki (New Zealand electorate), a parliamentary electorate in New Zealand
Ōtaki, New Zealand, a town in New Zealand
Ōtaki River, a river in New Zealand
Ōtaki, Chiba, a town in Japan
Ōtaki, Saitama, a former village in Japan
Ōtaki, Hokkaido, a former village in Japan
Ōtaki, Nagano, a village in Japan
Otaki, California, a former settlement in Butte County, California, U.S.

Ships
, sailing ship
, ship sunk in the action of 10 March 1917
, ship renamed Clan Robertson in 1934, Stanfleet in 1938 and Pacific Star in 1939, and sunk in 1942
, ship renamed Mahmoud in 1976 and Natalia in 1979, and scrapped in 1984

Other
"Otaki", a 1970 single by The Fourmyula